The 2016 24H Series powered by Hankook was the second season of the 24H Series with drivers battling for championship points and titles and the ninth season since Creventic, the organiser and promoter of the series, organises multiple races a year. The races were contested with GT3-spec cars, GT4-spec cars, sports cars, touring cars and 24H-Specials, like silhouette cars. The 24H Silverstone and the 24H Epilog Brno were part of both the 24H Series and the Touring Car Endurance Series, with only touring cars eligible for racing in the English round.

Calendar

Entry list

Results and standings

Race results
Bold indicates overall winner.

See also
24H Series
2016 Touring Car Endurance Series

Notes

References

External links

24H Series
24H Series
24H Series